Jaida Lee (born 2006) is a Canadian baseball player. At age 16, she was in 2022 the first female to compete in men’s baseball at the Canada Summer Games.

Lee is a senior at Gonzaga High School, in St. John's, Newfoundland and Labrador. Born in St. John's, to Dave and Amanda Lee. Lee started playing baseball at 6 years old, and has been playing on boy's and men's baseball teams since the age of 10.

Career

Early career 
Lee pitched for Newfoundland and Labrador's Female U-16 team in the 2021 Atlantic Female Under 16 Baseball Championship. During tournament, Lee was named Top Batter and Top Pitcher.  Also in 2021, Lee was the only girl on the province's  U-17 boys baseball team, where she pitched the team's win in Dartmouth, N.S. 

Lee was named Female Athlete of the Year, by Baseball NL in 2021.

Lee is on Baseball Canada's list of prospects for national team programs and in 2021, was among 41 players invited to a women’s national team (WNT) showcase event in Trois Rivières, Quebec.

Canada Summer Games 
Selections for Team N.L. began in 2019 and Lee was 13 years old when she attended her first selections camp. 

During the 2022 Canada Summer Games, Lee played with Team N.L. (Newfoundland and Labrador). Lee's first pitch was a strike. The ball, taken out of the game, will be on display at the Canadian Baseball Hall of Fame, in St. Mary's, Ontario.

MLB Ceremonial First Pitch 
Lee was invited and threw the ceremonial first pitch at the Toronto Blue Jays game versus the Cleveland Guardians on August 12, 2022, at the Rogers Centre.

References 

2006 births
Living people
Canadian female baseball players
Sportspeople from Newfoundland and Labrador